is a Japanese pioneering wheelchair tennis player and 2004 Summer Paralympics gold medalist (Men's doubles with Shingo Kunieda).

Saida, a big baseball enthusiast in his childhood, lost his left leg because of illness.  At first, he used to play wheelchair basketball with his friends.  At the age of fourteen, he had an opportunity to get to know wheelchair tennis with his basketball teammates at a seminar which took place in his hometown, and started this sport.

As a competitor, his first Paralympics was the 1996 Summer Paralympics in Atlanta, USA.  At the 2000 Summer Paralympics in Sydney, Australia, he got the eighth place.  With Shingo Kunieda, he participated in the 2004 Summer Paralympics in Athens, Greece, and won the men's doubles event. The two competed together again at the 2008 Beijing Games and took bronze in the doubles event.

References

External links 
 
 

1972 births
Living people
Japanese male tennis players
Wheelchair tennis players
Japanese people with disabilities
Paralympic wheelchair tennis players of Japan
Paralympic gold medalists for Japan
Paralympic bronze medalists for Japan
Paralympic medalists in wheelchair tennis
Medalists at the 2004 Summer Paralympics
Medalists at the 2008 Summer Paralympics
Medalists at the 2016 Summer Paralympics
Wheelchair tennis players at the 1996 Summer Paralympics
Wheelchair tennis players at the 2000 Summer Paralympics
Wheelchair tennis players at the 2004 Summer Paralympics
Wheelchair tennis players at the 2008 Summer Paralympics
Wheelchair tennis players at the 2016 Summer Paralympics
People from Yokkaichi
Sportspeople from Mie Prefecture
20th-century Japanese people
21st-century Japanese people